Marek Michał Grechuta (10 December 1945 – 9 October 2006) was a Polish singer, songwriter, composer, and lyricist.

Early life
Grechuta was born on 10 December 1945 in Zamość, Poland. He studied architecture at Tadeusz Kościuszko University of Technology in Kraków.

Career
While studying at university, he met the composer Jan Kanty Pawluśkiewicz. Together, they founded the student cabaret Anawa, in 1967. In the same year, Grechuta was placed second in the VI National Contest of Student Musicians (VI Ogólnopolski Konkurs Piosenkarzy Studenckich) and received an award for the album "Tango Anawa", with lyrics by him and music by Jan Kanty Pawluśkiewicz. In 1968, he won several awards at the Festival of Polish Music in Opole.

In 1969, Grechuta played a minor role in Andrzej Wajda's film Hunting Flies. In 1971, he left Anawa and founded the band WIEM (W Innej Epoce Muzycznej, In a Different Musical Epoch; note that wiem means I know in Polish).

Grechuta had a large number of popular hits, with his songs often characterized by the use of poetic and literary elements. He co-authored, along with P. Birula and K. Szwajgier, the music for Exodus (written by L. A. Moczulski) at the STU Theatre in Kraków (1974), and co-wrote the musical adaptation of Stanisław Witkiewicz's Szalona lokomotywa (The Crazy Locomotive) with K. Jasiński and J. K. Pawluśkiewicz in 1977.

In 2003, Grechuta collaborated with the group Myslovitz and re-recorded their older song "Kraków". His song "Dni, których nie znamy" is commonly regarded the unofficial anthem of the football club Korona Kielce.

Personal life
In 1970, Grechuta married his wife, Danuta. His son was named Łukasz.

He died on 9 October 2006 in Kraków and was buried in the Rakowicki Cemetery.

Discography

See also 
 Sung poetry

References

External links

 Marek Grechuta at culture.pl

1945 births
2006 deaths
People from Zamość
Polish composers
Sung poetry of Poland
Burials at Rakowicki Cemetery
Cabaret singers
Recipients of the Gold Medal for Merit to Culture – Gloria Artis
Commanders of the Order of Polonia Restituta
Officers of the Order of Polonia Restituta
20th-century Polish male singers
Tadeusz Kościuszko University of Technology alumni